Huddleston is an unincorporated community in Montgomery County, Arkansas, United States.

Notes

Unincorporated communities in Montgomery County, Arkansas
Unincorporated communities in Arkansas